Joel Fernando Zayas (born 17 September 1977 in Asunción) is a Paraguayan former football goalkeeper.

In June 2007, after great performances with his club Bolívar, he was selected for the Paraguay national football team that participated in the 2007 Copa America. In the quarterfinals of the competition, Paraguay played against Mexico. In the 2nd minute, goalkeeper Aldo Bobadilla was sent off after a bad challenge over Nery Castillo and after Justo Villar got injured earlier in the tournament, giving Zayas the chance to play in the rest of the match and his first cap. Paraguay ended playing the game with 10 players, and they eventually lost 6–0, thus ending the Copa America campaign.

After the Copa America tournament, Zayas was transferred to Guaraní. In 2009, he returned to Bolivia, only this time, he signed with Club Jorge Wilstermann.

External links

1977 births
Paraguayan footballers
Living people
Association football goalkeepers
Club Tacuary footballers
Club Bolívar players
Club Guaraní players
C.D. Jorge Wilstermann players
Club San José players
Colegio Nacional Iquitos footballers
Club Atlético 3 de Febrero players
Paraguay international footballers
Paraguayan expatriate sportspeople in Bolivia
Paraguayan expatriate footballers
Expatriate footballers in Bolivia
Expatriate footballers in Peru